Classical Arabic or Quranic Arabic is the standardized literary form of Arabic used from the 7th century and throughout the Middle Ages, most notably in Umayyad and Abbasid literary texts such as poetry, elevated prose and oratory, and is also the liturgical language of Islam. Classical Arabic is, furthermore, the register of the Arabic language on which Modern Standard Arabic is based.

The first comprehensive written grammar of Classical Arabic was al-Kitāb by the Persian Muslim grammarian Sibawayh, it was an exegesis of Arabic grammar largely based on the existing poetic texts and the works of previous grammarians, in addition to the Qurʾān and Bedouin informants whom he considered to be reliable speakers of Arabic. The primary focus of this work was to facilitate tafsir of the Qur'an and prophetic reports.

Modern Standard Arabic is its direct descendant used today throughout the Arab world in writing and in formal speaking, for example prepared speeches, some radio and TV broadcasts and non-entertainment content. Whilst the lexis and stylistics of Modern Standard Arabic are different from Classical Arabic, the morphology and syntax have remained basically unchanged (though Modern Standard Arabic uses a subset of the syntactic structures available in Classical Arabic). In the Arab world little distinction is made between Classical Arabic and Modern Standard Arabic and both are normally called al-fuṣḥā in Arabic, meaning 'the most eloquent'.

History

The earliest forms of Arabic are known as Old Arabic and survive in inscriptions in Ancient North Arabian scripts as well as fragments of pre-Islamic poetry preserved in the classical literature. By the late 6th century AD, it is hypothesized that a relatively uniform intertribal "poetic koiné", a synthetic language distinct from the spoken vernaculars, had developed with conservative, as well as innovative, features, including the case endings known as ʾiʿrab. It is uncertain to what degree the spoken vernaculars corresponded to the literary style, however, as many surviving inscriptions in the region seem to indicate simplification or absence of the inflectional morphology of Classical Arabic. It is often said that the Bedouin dialects of Najd were probably the most conservative (or at least resembled the elevated intertribal idiom morphologically and lexically more than the other contemporary vernaculars), a view possibly supported by the romanticization of the "purity" of the language of the desert-dwellers (as opposed to the "corrupted" dialects of the city-dwellers) expressed in many medieval Arabic works, especially those on grammar, though some argue that all the spoken vernaculars probably deviated greatly from the supraregional literary norm to different degrees, while others, such as Joshua Blau, believe that "the differences between the classical and spoken language were not too far-reaching".

The Arabic script is generally believed to have evolved from local cursive varieties of the Aramaic script, which have been adopted to write Arabic, though some, such as Jean Starcky, have postulated that it instead derives directly from the Syriac script since, unlike Aramaic, the scripts of Arabic and Syriac are both cursive. Indigenous speculations concerning the history of the script sometimes ascribe the origins of the script, and oftentimes the language itself also, to one of the ancient major figures in Islam, such as Adam or Ishmael, though others mention that it was introduced to Arabia from afar. In the 7th century AD, the distinctive features of Old Hijazi, such as loss of final short vowels, loss of hamza, lenition of final /-at/ to /-ah/, and lack of nunation, influenced the consonantal text (or rasm) of the Qur'an (and many of its readings also) and the later normalized orthography of Classical Arabic as a standard literary register in the 8th century.

By the 2nd century AH (9th century AD/CE), the language had been standardized by Arabic grammarians and knowledge of Classical Arabic became an essential prerequisite for rising into the higher classes throughout the Islamic world, as it was the lingua franca across the Middle East, North Africa, and the Horn of Africa, and thus, the region eventually developed into a widespread state of diglossia. Consequently, the classical language, as well as the Arabic script, became the subject of much mythicization and was eventually associated with religious, ethnic, and racial conflicts, such as the rise of many groups traditionally categorized under the broad label of al-Shu'ibiyya (roughly meaning "those of the nations", as opposed to Arab tribes), who, despite the remarkable differences in their views, generally rejected the stressed and often dogmatized belief that the Arabs, as well as their language, were far superior to all other races and ethnicities, and so the term later came to be applied pejoratively to such groups by their rivals. Moreover, many Arabic grammarians strove to attribute as many words as possible to a "pure Arabic origin", especially those in the Qur'an. Thus, exegetes, theologians, and grammarians who entertained the idea of the presence of "impurities" (for example, naturalized loanwords) in the Qur'an were severely criticized and their proposed etymologies denounced in most cases. Nonetheless, the belief in the racial and ethnic supremacy of the Arabs and the belief in the linguistic supremacy of Arabic did not seem to be necessary entailments of each other.

Poems and sayings attributed to Arabic-speaking personages who lived before the standardization of the Classical idiom, which are preserved mainly in far later manuscripts, contain traces of elements in morphology and syntax that began to be regarded as chiefly poetic or characteristically regional or dialectal. Despite this, these, along with the Qur'an, were perceived as the principal foundation upon which grammatical inquiry, theorizing, and reasoning were to be based. They also formed the literary ideal to be followed, quoted, and imitated in solemn texts and speeches. Lexically, Classical Arabic may retain one or more of the dialectal forms of a given word as variants of the standardized forms, albeit often with much less currency and use.

Various Arabic dialects freely borrowed words from Classical Arabic, a situation similar to the Romance languages, wherein scores of words were borrowed directly from Classical Latin. Arabic-speakers usually spoke Classical Arabic as a second language (if they spoke the colloquial dialects as their first language) or as a third language (if they spoke another language as their first language and a regional variety of colloquial Arabic as their second language). Nonetheless, the pronunciation of Classical Arabic was likely influenced by the vernaculars to different degrees (much like Modern Standard Arabic). The differences in pronunciation and vocabulary in the regional Arabic varieties were in turn variously influenced by the native languages spoken in the conquered regions, such as Coptic in Egypt; Berber and Punic in the Maghreb; Himyaritic, Modern South Arabian, and Old South Arabian in Yemen; and Aramaic in the Levant.

Phonology

Consonants 

Like Modern Standard Arabic, Classical Arabic had 28 consonant phonemes:

Notes:

Sibawayh described the consonant  as voiced, but some modern linguists cast doubt upon this testimony. It is likely that the word used to describe it didn't mean voiced but rather unaspirated.    
As it derives from Proto-Semitic *g,  may have been a palatalized velar: .

This is retrospectively reconstructed based on ancient texts describing the proper pronunciation and discouraging the use of any other pronunciation.

 is emphatic except before  or  when it becomes unemphatic .

Vowels

Notes: 
  arose from two separate sources, often conflated:
The contraction of the triphthong . Some Arabs said banē (< *banaya) for banā ("he built") and zēda (< *zayida) for zāda ("it increased").
Imala could also occur in the absence of an i-vowel in an adjacent syllable. It was considered acceptable Classical Arabic by Sibawayh, and still occurs in numerous modern Arabic dialects, particularly the urban dialects of the Fertile Crescent and the Mediterranean.
 [] may have been the original pronunciation of a final ی which is otherwise pronounced as []. In the Kisā'i and Hamzah recitations of the Qur'an, this pronunciation is used, whereas in the Hafs pronunciation  is used instead. An example of this can be seen in the names Mūsā (Moses), 'īsā (Jesus), and Yahyā (John), which would be pronounced as Musē, 'īsē and Yahyē in the former two manners of recitation.

Grammar

Nouns

Case 
The A1 inscription dated to the 3rd or 4th century AD in the Greek alphabet in a dialect showing affinities to that of the Safaitic inscriptions shows that short final high vowels had been lost in at least some dialects of Old Arabic at that time, obliterating the distinction between nominative and genitive case in the singular, leaving the accusative the only marked case:

Classical Arabic however, shows a far more archaic system, essentially identical with that of Proto-Arabic:

State 
The definite article spread areally among the Central Semitic languages and it would seem that Proto-Arabic lacked any overt marking of definiteness. Besides dialects with no definite article, the Safaitic inscriptions exhibit about four different article forms, ordered by frequency: h-, ʾ-, ʾl-, and hn-. The Old Arabic of the Nabataean inscriptions exhibits almost exclusively the form ʾl-. Unlike the Classical Arabic article, the Old Arabic ʾl almost never exhibits the assimilation of the coda to the coronals; the same situation is attested in the Graeco-Arabica, but in A1 the coda assimilates to the following d, αδαυρα *ʾad-dawra  'the region'.

In Classical Arabic, the definite article takes the form al-, with the coda of the article exhibiting assimilation to the following dental and denti-alveolar consonants. Note the inclusion of palatal , which alone among the palatal consonants exhibits assimilation, indicating that assimilation ceased to be productive before that consonant shifted from Old Arabic :

Verbs

Barth-Ginsberg alternation 
Proto-Central Semitic, Proto-Arabic, various forms of Old Arabic, and some modern Najdi dialects to this day have alternation in the performative vowel of the prefix conjugation, depending on the stem vowel of the verb. Early forms of Classical Arabic allowed this alternation, but later forms of Classical Arabic levelled the /a/ allomorph:

See also 

Arabic language
Modern Standard Arabic
Varieties of Arabic
Ancient North Arabian
Quranic Arabic Corpus
Arabic–English Lexicon

Notes

References

Holes, Clive (2004) Modern Arabic: Structures, Functions, and Varieties Georgetown University Press.  
Versteegh, Kees (2001) The Arabic Language Edinburgh University Press  (Ch.5 available in link below)

External links

 Classical Arabic Grammar Documentation – Visualization of Classical Quranic Grammar
 – Lectures on Quranic Arabic by Dr. Khalid Zaheer (CA)
 Institute of the Language of the Quran - Free Video lectures on basic and advanced Classical Arabic grammar
  - A hub for learners of Classical Arabic.

 
Arabic languages
Arabic
Arabic
Sacred languages
Arabic, Classical
Languages attested from the 7th century
7th-century establishments in Asia